Sander Station is a railway station located in Sander in Sør-Odal, Norway on the Kongsvinger Line. The station was built in 1862 as part of the Kongsvinger Line. The station is served five times daily Oslo Commuter Rail line R14 operated by Vy.

Railway stations in Hedmark
Railway stations on the Kongsvinger Line
Railway stations opened in 1862
1862 establishments in Norway